"Sucker Punch" is a song recorded by Norwegian singer-songwriter Sigrid for her debut studio album of the same name. It was released on 4 October 2018 as the third single from the album. A power pop song, it lyrically talks about falling in love without realizing it. An accompanying music video was released on 26 October 2018. It consists of Sigrid dancing through several sequences. "Sucker Punch" was performed on Later... with Jools Holland.

Background and composition 
"Sucker Punch" was recorded in the singer's hometown. A power pop number, it was written by Sigrid, Martin Sjølie, and Emily Warren. It lyrically talks about falling in love without realizing it. Sigrid described the song as "a result of our usual way of working: talking, cooking, strolling, singing, dancing, experimenting."

Music video 
The music video for "Sucker Punch" was released on 26 October 2018. It consists of the singer dancing through several sequences, including a night, a motorway, several parties, and a running track. The video was filmed in London.

Live performances 
Sigrid performed "Sucker Punch" on Later... with Jools Holland.

Track listing 
Digital download
 "Sucker Punch" – 3:14

Acoustic Version

 "Sucker Punch" (Acoustic) - 3:57

Four Tet Remix

 "Sucker Punch" (Four Tet Remix) – 4:08

Credits and personnel 
Adapted from Tidal.

 Sigrid – vocals, composition
 Martin Sjølie – composition, production, engineering, programming
 Emily Warren – composition
 John Hanes – mixing assistance, engineering, mix engineering
 Kim Åge Furuhaug – drums
 Thomas Stenersen – electric guitar
 Henning Svoren – engineering
 Chris Gheringer – master engineering
 Serban Ghenea – mixing, mix engineering
 Stephen Bartlett – vocal engineering, vocal production

Charts

References 

2018 singles
2018 songs
Power pop songs
Sigrid (singer) songs
Songs written by Emily Warren
Songs written by Martin Sjølie
Island Records singles
Songs written by Sigrid (singer)